Juan Rodriguez (Dutch: ,) was the first documented non-indigenous inhabitant to live on Manhattan Island. As such, he is considered the first non-native resident of what would eventually become New York City.

As he was born in the Captaincy General of Santo Domingo, the first colony of Spain, to a Portuguese sailor and a West African woman, he is considered by many to be the first person of European and/or West African origin to settle on the island of Manhattan.

Biography
Rodriguez was born in the Captaincy General of Santo Domingo (now the Dominican Republic) to an African woman and a Portuguese sailor, in an era in which a tenth of the Dominican population was born in Portugal, which at that time was in dynastic union with the Spanish Crown (see Iberian Union).

Raised in a culturally diverse environment in the Spanish settlement of Santo Domingo, Rodrigues was known for his linguistic talents and was hired by the Dutch captain Thijs Volckenz Mossel of the Jonge Tobias to serve as the translator on a trading voyage to the Lenape island of Mannahattan. 

Arriving in 1613, Rodrigues soon came to learn the Algonquian language of the Lenape people and married into the local community. When Mossel's ship returned to the Netherlands, Rodrigues stayed behind with his Lenape family and set up his own trading post with goods given to him by Mossel, consisting of eighty hatchets, some knives, a musket and a sword.

He spent the winter without the support of anchored ship, at a Dutch fur trading post on Lower Manhattan that had been set up by Hendrick Christiaensen in 1613. This small settlement and others along the North River, such as Fort Nassau (Albany), were part of a private enterprise. In 1621 the Dutch Republic firmly established its claim to New Netherland and offered a patent for a trade monopoly in the region. In 1624, a group of settlers established a small colony on Governors Island. Together with a contingent of coming from the Netherlands that same year, the traders established in the settlement of New Amsterdam.

Report of Adriaen Block

In the early spring of 1613, fur trader Adriaen Block complained bitterly that a competitor, Thijs Volckenz Mossel, commander of the Jonge Tobias, had tried to "spoil the trade" by offering three times more for a beaver than Block did. In his report against Mossel, which he submitted to the Amsterdam Notary upon his return to Holland, Block topped off his list of accusations against Mossel with his outrage that

According to Block, Mossel denied that Rodrigues was working on his behalf. Rodrigues had taken it upon himself to gain friendship with the natives, set up a trading post, and live comfortably on Manhattan Island.

Mossel declared that

Block closed his report by writing that he knew of no other crewman who stayed behind but Rodrigues. The natives, who preferred the goods and ironware sold by Rodrigues over their own, seemed to have accepted him as the island's first merchant.

By the autumn of 1613, three Dutch ships had arrived: De Tijger, captained by Block; the Fortuyn, captained by Hendrick Christiaensen; and the Nachtegaal, captained by Mossel. This time it was Christiaensen who wrote about Rodrigues. His log states that Rodrigues came aboard the Nachtegaal, presented himself as a freeman, and offered to work for Christiaensen trading furs. The historical record leaves us with few details about the remainder of the life of Jan Rodrigues.

A mural created by Creative Arts Workshops for Kids in 2009, in sponsorship with the Harlem River Park Task Force, Harlem Community Development Corporation and New York State Department of Transportation, depicts an image of Jan Rodrigues as he might have appeared in 1613.

Juan Rodríguez Way

In October 2012, the New York City Council enacted legislation to name Broadway from 159th Street to 218th Street in Manhattan after Juan Rodríguez. The neighborhoods of Washington Heights and Inwood in Upper Manhattan have a substantial Dominican community. The first street sign was put up in a celebration with a small ceremony at 167th Street and Broadway on May 15, 2013.

Fiction
Writer John Keene published a brief, fictional version of Juan Rodríguez's (Jan Rodrigues's) story, entitled "Mannahatta", focusing on the trader's decision to flee the Dutch, in the Winter/Spring 2014 issue of the literary journal TriQuarterly. A revised version of the story appears in his 2015 collection Counternarratives, published by New Directions.

See also 
 Dorothy Creole

References

Further reading
 Stevens-Acevedo, Anthony; Weterings, Tom; and Francés, Leonor Alvarez, "Juan Rodriguez and the Beginnings of New York City" (2013). CUNY Dominican Studies Institute. (full-text)
 Feiden, Douglas. "Who was the first non-Native American settler in Manhattan? Dominican immigrant Juan Rodriguez in 1613", New York Daily News, October 5, 2012
 

Dominican Republic people of Portuguese descent
Mixed-race Dominicans
History of New York City
Rodriguez
People from New York City
17th-century deaths
Year of birth unknown
American people of Portuguese descent